The Damgård–Jurik cryptosystem is a generalization of the Paillier cryptosystem. It uses computations modulo  where  is an RSA modulus and  a (positive) natural number. It is semantically secure if it is hard to decide if two given elements are in the same coset. Like Paillier, the security of Damgård–Jurik can be proven under the decisional composite residuosity assumption.

Key generation 
Choose two large prime numbers p and q randomly and independently of each other.
For instance  could be  as in Paillier's original scheme.

Encryption 
Let  be a message to be encrypted where .
Select random  where .
Compute ciphertext as: .

Decryption 
Ciphertext 
Compute . If c is a valid ciphertext then .
Apply a recursive version of the Paillier decryption mechanism to obtain . As  is known, it is possible to compute .

Simplification 
At the cost of no longer containing the classical Paillier cryptosystem as an instance, Damgård–Jurik can be simplified in the following way:

In this case decryption produces . Using recursive Paillier decryption this gives us directly the plaintext m.

See also
 The Damgård–Jurik cryptosystem interactive simulator demonstrates a voting application.

References

Public-key encryption schemes